Zdeněk Kutlák (born February 13, 1980) is a Czech professional ice hockey defender who last played for HC Příbram of the 2nd Czech Republic Hockey League. He played 16 games for the Boston Bruins of the National Hockey League between 2000 and 2004. Internationally Kutlák has played for the Czech national team at two World Championships, winning a bronze in 2012.

Playing career
Kutlák was drafted 237th overall by the Boston Bruins in the 2000 NHL Entry Draft from his local team HC České Budějovice. He spent most of his time in the American Hockey League for the Providence Bruins, but managed to play 16 games in the National Hockey League for Boston, scoring one goal and two assists for three points.

After four seasons in the Bruins organization, Kutlák returned to the Czech Extraliga, signing for HC Energie Karlovy Vary during the lockout in 2004 before re-joining Budějovice in 2005.  In 2007, Kutlák moved to Switzerland and signed for National League A side HC Ambri-Piotta.

On August 14, 2014, Kutlák continued his journeyman career in opting to sign a one-year contract with Austrian club, EC Red Bull Salzburg, of the EBEL.

Career statistics

Regular season and playoffs

International

References

External links
 

1980 births
Living people
Boston Bruins draft picks
Boston Bruins players
Czech ice hockey defencemen
EC Red Bull Salzburg players
HC Ambrì-Piotta players
Motor České Budějovice players
HC Davos players
HC Karlovy Vary players
HC Slovan Bratislava players
IHC Písek players
KLH Vajgar Jindřichův Hradec players
Providence Bruins players
Sportspeople from České Budějovice
Czech expatriate ice hockey players in the United States
Czech expatriate ice hockey players in Switzerland
Czech expatriate ice hockey players in Slovakia
Czech expatriate sportspeople in Austria
Expatriate ice hockey players in Austria